Events from the year 1844 in France.

Incumbents
 Monarch – Louis Philippe I

Events
6 August - First Franco-Moroccan War begins.
14 August - Battle of Isly, French victory over Moroccan forces near Oujda, Morocco, ending the First Franco-Moroccan War.
28 August - Friedrich Engels and Karl Marx meet in Paris.
10 September - Treaty of Tangiers, whereby Morocco officially recognized Algeria as part of the French Empire.
24 October - Treaty of Whampoa, a commercial treaty between France and China, is signed.
French Industrial Exposition of 1844

Births
7 January - St. Bernadette Soubirous, (died 1879)
21 February - Charles-Marie Widor, organist and composer (died 1937)
26 February - Étienne Aymonier, linguist, explorer and archaeologist (died 1929)
30 March - Paul Verlaine, poet (died 1896)
16 April - Anatole France, author, awarded Nobel Prize for Literature in 1921 (died 1924)
3 May - Édouard Drumont, journalist and writer (died 1917) 
21 May - Henri Rousseau, painter (died 1910)
3 August - Marcel-Auguste Dieulafoy, archaeologist (died 1920)
22 October - Sarah Bernhardt, actress (died 1923)
23 October - Edouard Branly, inventor and physicist (died 1940)
8 December - Charles-Émile Reynaud, science teacher, responsible for the first animated films (died 1918)

Deaths
1 January - Gustave Maximilien Juste de Croÿ-Solre, Cardinal, Archbishop of Rouen (born 1773)
25 January - Jean-Baptiste Drouet, Comte d'Erlon, Marshal of France (born 1765)
27 January - Charles Nodier, author (born 1780)
8 March - Charles XIV John of Sweden, King of Sweden and Norway, Marshal of France (born 1763)
26 May - Jacques Laffitte, banker and politician (born 1767)
3 June - Louis-Antoine, Duke of Angoulême, the last Dauphin of France (born 1775)
28 July - Joseph Bonaparte, elder brother of Napoleon I, who made him King of Naples and Sicily and later King of Spain (born 1768)
14 November - Flora Tristan, socialist writer and activist (born 1803)

Full date unknown
Jean-Baptiste Lepère, architect (born 1761)

References

1840s in France